The Military University of the Ministry of Defense of the Russian Federation is a Russian military university operated by the Ministry of Defense of Russia (MOD). It is located on 14 Bol'shaya Sadovaya Street in Moscow. Since October 2017, the Commanding officer of the university has been Lieutenant General Igor Mishutkin.

History
The Military University started as the Teaching Institute of the Red Army which opened on November 5, 1919 by the order of N.G. Tolmachev of the Petrograd Military District. The first commanding officer of the school was Mikhail Apletin. On August 1, 1974, the Military Institute of the Ministry of Defense (Soviet Union) was formed as an affiliated school of the Vladimir Lenin Military-Political Academy. The modern university was established on July 20, 1994 on the basis of the unification of the Military-Political Academy and Military Institute of the Armed Forces of the USSR. For the first time in one school, the economic, humanitarian, legal and philological areas of officer training were taught at the university level.

Lineage
Vladimir Lenin Military-Political Academy
Military Institute of Foreign Languages 
Military Law Academy
Military Financial Academy
Lviv Higher Military-Political School
Moscow Military Conservatory

Leadership

Current Leadership structure
Commanding Officer – Igor Mishutkin 
Deputy Commanding Officer – Vladimir Lugovoy 
Deputy Commandant of the Military University – Vladimir Meadov 
Deputy Commandant of the Military University for Academic and Scientific Work – Mikhail Smyslov 
Deputy Commandant of the Military University – Valery Shevtsov
Deputy Commandant of the Military University – Marisa Krasnoperova
Deputy Commandant of the Military University for Military Political Work – Sergey Basov
Chief Researcher and Academic Supervisor – Valery Marchenkov

List of Commanding Officers

 1974-1978 - Colonel General Ivan Katyshkin
 1978-1988 - Colonel General Magomed Tankaev
 1988-1992 - Lieutenant-General Alexey Tyurin
 1992-1993 - Lieutenant-General Yu. V. Mishin
 1994-1999 - Colonel General Nikolai Zvinchukov
 1999-2001 - Colonel General Ivan Efremov
 2001-2017 - Colonel General Valery Marchenkov
 2017-Present - Lieutenant General Igor Mishutkin

Offerings

The university focuses on the five areas of military-humanitarian, military-legal, military-philological, military-conductor and military-financial. It has undergraduate, post graduate and professional continuing education. There are 53 departments across 10 faculties. It teaches 22 foreign languages. There are 11 dissertation councils. In addition to training active duty military, the school offers 15 civilian specialties for recently discharged military members seeking retraining.

The university is organized into the following sections:

 College of Military Music and Institute of Military Band Conductors
 National Guard College of the Military University
 College of Military Finance
 College of Military Justice
 College of Military Humanities
 College of Foreign Languages
 Special Faculties Course
 Faculty of Foreign Budgets and Finances
 Advanced Training and Continuing Education College
 Military Prosecution Institute

Institute of Military Band Conductors
The Institute of Military Band Conductors, which falls as part of the College of Military Music, is a sub-branch of the Military University of the Ministry of Defense.

History
The history of the institution dates back to 1935, when a military department was created on the basis of the department of the orchestra faculty of the Moscow State Conservatory. In 1938, the faculty was expanded, organizing full-time post-graduate studies in the specialties of conducting and instrumentation. In 1944, the military department became a separate military musical university and in August 1945, the university was solemnly awarded Battle Banner. In November 1946, the university was renamed to the Higher School of Military Conductors of the Soviet Army. In 1960, during a campaign to reduce the size of the Soviet Armed Forces, the Institute of Military Conductors was reorganized into the Military Conducting Department at the Tchaikovsky Conservatory 
On 4 April 2001, the Government of Russia renamed the department as the Moscow Military Conservatory. On 10 April 2006, it was transferred to the Military University, becoming today the Institute of Military Band Conductors.

Activities

It often holds inter-university practical conferences on musical training methods.

Bands
The Cadet Band of the Institute of Military Band Conductors is a military marching band and instrumental ensemble in the Ministry of Defense of Russia (MOD) and the larger Russian Armed Forces. The band has repeatedly performed at international competitions and festivals, in various television and radio broadcasts. The university band team is the affiliated marching band of the university, being the equivalent of the Band of the Royal Military College of Canada. It is a diploma winner of the review competition of the regular military bands of Moscow Military District. It plays an important role in the educational activities of the university. It annually participates in the Moscow Victory Day Parade and the parade dedicated to 1941 October Revolution Parade. It often performs at central venues in Moscow, such as the Great Hall of the Moscow Conservatory, the Central Academic Theater of the Russian Army, and the Central House of Officers of the Russian Army.

Foreign students
Most nations in the Commonwealth of Independent States have an agreement with the university that calls for the intake of their military personnel into the university. A number of individual Arab countries (Libya, Yemen, Egypt etc.) are being trained at graduate courses of the special faculty of the Military University. In January 2020, the Council of Ministers of Thailand approved a draft agreement on sending cadets of the Royal Thai Armed Forces cadets to courses at the university.

Gallery

References

External links

Official Website

Military academies of Russia
Ministry of Defence (Russia)
Universities in Moscow
Educational institutions established in 1919
Educational institutions established in 1994
1919 establishments in Russia
1994 establishments in Russia